Hornsby may refer to:

Places 
 Hornsby, Cumbria, a place in Cumbria, Northern England
 Hornsby, New South Wales, a suburb of Sydney, Australia
 Hornsby railway station
 Hornsby Shire, New South Wales, local government area of Sydney
 Electoral district of Hornsby, a seat in the New South Wales Legislative Assembly located in the region
 Hornsby Plateau, north of Sydney
 Hornsby, Tennessee in the United States of America
 Hornsby Mountains in the Falkland Islands
 Hornsby (crater) on the Moon
 Hornsby Spring, a 1st magnitude spring in Alachua County, Florida

Other uses 
 Hornsby (surname)
 Richard Hornsby & Sons, engine manufacturers
 Hornsby Brand Design, branding, design, and advertising firm

See also 
 Hornby (disambiguation)
 Hornsby Heights, New South Wales, a suburb of Sydney, Australia